This is a list of media in Sherbrooke, Quebec.

Radio

Some radio stations from other areas of Estrie, as well as Montreal and the United States, can also be heard in Sherbrooke. Examples include CKGM 690 AM, CKAC 730 AM, CKOI-FM 96.9, WMOO 92.1 FM, WHOM 94.9 FM and WPKQ 103.7 FM.

Television
Sherbrooke's broadcast television stations are transmitted from nearby Orford.

Newspapers
The daily newspapers are La Tribune and The Record. Voir, a cultural magazine, also publishes a regional edition on Thursdays. Also, a student newspaper, Le Collectif, is published at the Université de Sherbrooke.

References

Sherbrooke
 
Media, Sherbrooke